The Wentworth River is a perennial river of the Mitchell River catchment, located in the East Gippsland region of the Australian state of Victoria.

Features and location
The river flows generally southeast, then southwest, then south in a highly meandering course through a state forestry area, joined by four minor tributaries, before reaching its confluence with the Wonnangatta River and Swamp Creek to form the Mitchell River north of the Mitchell River National Park, in the Shire of East Gippsland. The river descends  over its  course.

Etymology

In the Aboriginal Braiakaulung dialect of the Gunai language, there are two names for the Wentworth River; Tally-yalmy, meaning "shark" referring to an oral legend that a long time ago, "old man Blackfellow" caught a little shark at the mouth of the Wentworth River; and Daberda'bara, meaning "rocky bank".

See also

 List of rivers in Australia

References

External links
 
 

East Gippsland catchment
Rivers of Gippsland (region)